On 16 November 2022, an attack claims the lives of six police officers, including ASI (Assistant Sub-Inspector) in Lakki Marwat, Khyber Pakhtunkhwa, Pakistan.

At least six police officers, including an Assistant Sub-Inspector (ASI), died when two motorcycle-riding terrorists opened fire on their patrol vehicle. banned terrorist organization Tehrik-i-Taliban Pakistan (TTP) accepted the responsibility of attack.

Reactions
 President Arif Alvi, who strongly condemned the terrorist assault. He said The nation's will to combat the threat of terrorism cannot be weakened by such heinous deeds
 Prime minister, Shehbaz Sharif fiercely denounced the terrorist incident, and said that all measures will be done to protect the nation from its adversaries.
 Foreign Minister Bilawal Bhutto Zardari and Interior Minister Rana Sanaullah both strongly denounced the terrorist incident.

References

2022 in Pakistan
November 2022 events in Pakistan
Lakki Marwat District
2022 crimes in Pakistan
Mass murder in 2022
Mass murder in Pakistan
November 2022 crimes in Asia
2022 in Khyber Pakhtunkhwa
Terrorist incidents in Pakistan in 2022